Barbara (Louise) Trapido (born 1941 as Barbara Schuddeboom), is a British novelist born in South Africa with German, Danish and Dutch ancestry. Born in Cape Town and growing up in Durban she studied at the University of Natal gaining a BA in 1963 before emigrating to London. After many years teaching, she became a full-time writer in 1970.

Trapido has published seven novels, three of which have been nominated for the Whitbread Prize.  Her semi-autobiographical Frankie & Stankie, one of those shortlisted, which deals with growing up white under apartheid, gained a great deal of critical attention, most of it favourable. It was also longlisted for the Booker prize.

Barbara Trapido lives with her family in Oxford and some of her books have Oxford connections.

Bibliography

Brother of the More Famous Jack (1982)
Noah's Ark (1984)
Temples of Delight (1990)
Juggling (1994)
The Travelling Hornplayer (1998)
Frankie & Stankie (2003)
Sex & Stravinsky (2010)

Reviews
Frankie & Stankie, Observer newspaper
Frankie & Stankie, Telegraph newspaper
Sex & Stravinsky, The Independent newspaper

External links
Barbara Trapido: Biography and critical perspective from the British Council.
"The awkward squad".  Trapido writes  in The Guardian newspaper about the process of creating a novel.

References

1941 births
Living people
Writers from Cape Town
20th-century British novelists
21st-century British novelists
South African women novelists
Fellows of the Royal Society of Literature
Writers from Oxford
University of Natal alumni
British people of German descent
South African emigrants to the United Kingdom
British people of Danish descent
British people of Dutch descent
21st-century British women writers
20th-century British women writers